Beaumont, originally de Beaumont, is an English surname of Norman origin or a French surname. Notable people with the surname include:

Non fictional
 Beaumont, surname of early holders of the title Earl of Leicester
 Antony Beaumont (born 1949), English and German musicologist, writer, conductor and violinist
 Betty Bentley Beaumont (1828–1892), British author and merchant
 Bill Beaumont (born 1952), English rugby union player
 Bryan Beaumont (1938–2005), Australian judge
 Callum Beaumont, Scottish bagpipe player
 Charles Beaumont (1929–1967), American writer
 Chevalier d'Eon (Charles-Geneviève-Louis-Auguste-André-Timothée d'Éon de Beaumont), French diplomat and spy who lived his life as a woman
 Christopher Beaumont (born 1961), Australian painter
 Dudley Beaumont (1877–1918), British Army officer and painter, member of the ruling family of Sark
 Ephraim Beaumont (1834–1918), American politician
 Ermengarde de Beaumont (c. 1170–1233/34), Queen Consort of Scotland
 Francis Beaumont (disambiguation), several people
 Francis William Lionel Collings Beaumont (1903–1941), member of the ruling family of Sark
 Frederick Beaumont (1833–1899), British colonel, engineer and inventor
 Geoffrey Beaumont (1903–1970), Anglican priest and monk
 George Beaumont (disambiguation), several people
 Ginger Beaumont (1876–1956), American Major League Baseball player
 Gustave de Beaumont (1802–1866), French writer, magistrate and prison reformer
 Harry Beaumont (1888–1966), American film director
 Henry de Beaumont (disambiguation), several people
 Hugh Beaumont (1909–1982), American actor
 Hughes de Beaumont (1874–1947), French artist
 Hugh Binkie Beaumont (1908–1973), British theatre impresario
 Jack Beaumont (disambiguation), several people
 Jean-Baptiste Élie de Beaumont (1798–1874), French geologist
 Jeanne-Marie Leprince de Beaumont (1711–1780), French novelist known for the most popular version of the story Beauty and the Beast
 Jimmy Beaumont (1940–2017), American singer of the doo-wop group The Skyliners
 John Beaumont (disambiguation) , several people
 Joseph Beaumont (1616–1699), English clergyman, academic and poet
 Kathryn Beaumont (born 1938), British-American voice actress and school teacher
 Kenneth Macdonald Beaumont (1884–1965), British lawyer, officer, and figure skater
 Lewis Beaumont (disambiguation), several people
 Lucy Beaumont (actress) (1873–1937), English actress
 Lucy Beaumont (comedian) (born 1984), British actress, writer, and stand-up comedian
 Lyne Beaumont (born 1978), Canadian Olympic synchronized swimmer
 Marc Antoine de Beaumont (1763–1830), French cavalry general
 Marguerite de Beaumont (1899–1989), British Girl Guide leader, horse breeder, author and poet
 Mark Beaumont (cyclist) (born 1983), Scottish cyclist
 Mary Lawson (actress) (1910–1941), British actress who married Francis William Lionel Collings Beaumont
 Matt Beaumont, British novelist
 Mona Beaumont (1927–2007), French–born American painter and printmaker
 Nigel Beaumont (born 1967), English footballer
 Percy Beaumont (1897–1967), English footballer
 Robert de Beaumont, 1st Earl of Leicester (1049–1118), powerful English and French nobleman noted for his wisdom
 Robert de Beaumont, 2nd Earl of Leicester (1104–1168), Justiciar of England
 Robert de Beaumont, 3rd Earl of Leicester (died 1190), English nobleman
 Roger de Beaumont (1015–1094), a seigneur of Normandy
 Roger de Beaumont (bishop) (died 1202)
 Roland Beamont, British fighter pilot of World War II, later a test pilot
 Scott Beaumont, English mountain bike racer
 Sibyl Mary Hathaway (1884–1974), 21st Seigneur of Sark, married to Dudley John Beaumont
 Simon Beaumont (born 1975), Australian rules footballer.
 Timothy Beaumont, Baron Beaumont of Whitley (1928–2008), British politician and Anglican clergyman
 William Beaumont (1427–1453), lord of the manor of Shirwell in North Devon
 William Beaumont, 2nd Viscount Beaumont (1438–1507), soldier and landowner
 William Beaumont (1785–1853), U.S. Army surgeon, the "Father of Gastric Physiology"
 William Comyns Beaumont (1873–1956), British journalist, author, and lecturer
 William Rawlins Beaumont (1803–1875), British-Canadian surgeon
 William Spencer Beaumont, British army officer and a member of the London County Council
 William Worby Beaumont (1848–1929), British automotive engineer and inventor
 The Beaumont children disappearance in Australia

Fictional
 Andrea Beaumont, aka the Phantasm, a DC Comics Batman villain
 Jeffrey Beaumont, protagonist of the film Blue Velvet
 Remy Beaumont, a main character in the television series Ravenswood
 Simon and Terry Beaumont, Remy's parents

See also
 House of Beaumont, an Anglo-Norman baronial family
 Beaumont (disambiguation)

English-language surnames
French-language surnames
Surnames of Norman origin
English toponymic surnames